

Current screen readers

Unfinished screenreader projects

Discontinued and/or obsoleted screen readers

Software aids for people with reading difficulties 

 Automatik Text Reader from Davide Baldini (Firefox extension)
 BrowseAloud from Texthelp Systems Inc
 Capture Assistant from Renovation Software
 ClaroRead from Claro Software
 Claro ScreenRuler Suite from Claro Software
 ClickHear from gh LLC
 ClickHear Mobile from gh LLC
 ClipSpeak (last update: 2009) from Daniel Innala Ahlmark
 EasyTutor from Dolphin Computer Access
 EnVision: basic multi-featured Windows accessibility tool
 Kurzweil 1000 (for the visually impaired) and Kurzweil 3000-firefly (for those with reading or writing difficulty) from Kurzweil Educational Systems
 Penfriend from Penfriend Ltd
 ReadHear from gh LLC
 ReadSpeaker from ReadSpeaker Holding B.V.
 Read & Write from TextHelp Systems
 ReadPlease from ReadPlease Corporation 
 Read:OutLoud from Don Johnston, Inc.
 Screen Reader from SourceBinary.com (no longer available, latest trial version can be obtained from other download sites)
 SodelsCot from Sodels Factory
 TextAloud from NextUp.com
 Ultra Hal TTS Reader from Zabaware, Inc.
 yRead from Spacejock Software

References